Polish Catholic and Polish Catholic Church may refer to:

 The Catholic Church in Poland, mainstream Catholic Church in Poland
 One of several churches of Polish Old Catholicism, a form of Old Catholicism
 Polish National Catholic Church (est. ca. 1897), located mainly in the United States, member of the Union of Scranton
 Polish-Catholic Church of Republic of Poland, member of the Union of Utrecht
 Old Catholic Church in Poland (est. 1931)
 Polish-Catholic Church in United Kingdom (est. 2018)
Christ Catholic Church of the Americas and Europe, formerly called Polish Old Catholic Church

See also
 Polish Church (disambiguation)
 Mariavite Church (est. 1906), another Old-Catholic denomination based in Poland
 Catholic Mariavite Church (est. 1935)
Polish Cathedral style